The following lists events that happened during 1920 in New Zealand.

Incumbents

Regal and viceregal
 Head of State  – George V
 Governor-General – Arthur Foljambe, 2nd Earl of Liverpool until 7 July, then John Jellicoe, Viscount Jellicoe from 27 September

Government
The 20th New Zealand Parliament commences, with the Reform Party in Government

 Speaker of the House – Frederic Lang (Reform Party)
 Prime Minister – William Massey
 Minister of Finance – James Allen until 28 April, then William Massey from 12 May
 Minister of External Affairs – James Allen until 28 April, then Ernest Lee from 17 May

Parliamentary opposition
 Leader of the Opposition – William MacDonald (Liberal Party) until his death on 31 August, then Thomas Wilford

Judiciary
 Chief Justice – Sir Robert Stout

Main centre leaders
 Mayor of Auckland – James Gunson
 Mayor of Wellington – John Luke
 Mayor of Christchurch – Henry Thacker
 Mayor of Dunedin – William Begg

Events 
 1 May – The Colonist, established in 1857, publishes its final issue, and is incorporated into The Nelson Evening Mail.
 25 August – Captain Euan Dickson makes the first aerial crossing of Cook Strait, from Christchurch to Upper Hutt, in an Avro 504K.

Arts and literature

See 1920 in art, 1920 in literature, :Category:1920 books

Music

See: 1920 in music

Film

See: :Category:1920 film awards, 1920 in film, List of New Zealand feature films, Cinema of New Zealand, :Category:1920 films

Sport

Chess
 The 29th National Chess Championship, held in Wellington, is won by W. E. Mason of Wellington, his fifth title.

Cricket
 Plunket Shield

Football
 Provincial league champions:
 Auckland – YMCA
 Canterbury – Nomads
 Hawke's Bay – Waipukurau
 Otago – Kaitangata FC
 Southland – No competition
 Wanganui – Eastbrooke
 Wellington – Wellington Thistle

Golf
 The 10th New Zealand Open championship is won by J. H. Kirkwood
 The 24th National Amateur Championships are held in Hamilton:
 Men – Sloan Morpeth (Hamilton)
 Women – N. E. Wright (her second title)

Horse racing

Harness racing
 New Zealand Trotting Cup – Reta Peter
 Auckland Trotting Cup – Man O'War

Thoroughbred racing
 New Zealand Cup – Oratress
 Auckland Cup – Starland
 Wellington Cup – Kilmoon / Oratress (dead heat)
 New Zealand Derby – Duo

Lawn bowls
The national outdoor lawn bowls championships are held in Christchurch.
 Men's singles champion – E. Harraway (Dunedin Bowling Club)
 Men's pair champions – J. Turnbull, W. Spiller (skip) (Sydenham Bowling Club)
 Men's fours champions – H. Brookfield, F.L. Anderson, H.F. Tilley, A.P. London (skip) (Wanganui Bowling Club)

Olympic games

{| class="wikitable"
|-
!  !!  !!  !! Total
|- style="text-align:center;"
| 0 || 0 || 1 || 1
|}
 New Zealand sends a team of four competitors across three sports
 Darcy Hadfield wins the bronze medal in the men's single sculls
 New Zealand also competes at the Inter-Allied Games held in Paris

Rugby league

 The Great Britain Lions tour New Zealand, winning the test series 3–0
 1st test, at Wellington, 23–10
 2nd test, at Christchurch, 19–3
 3rd test, at Auckland, 31–7

Rugby union
 The All Blacks tour New South Wales
  defends the Ranfurly Shield 10 times before losing it to :
vs  15–3
vs  22–3
vs  20–9 (played in Hāwera)
vs  20–5
vs  23–20 (played in Auckland)
vs Taranaki 16–5
vs  20–14
vs Auckland 20–3
vs  32–16 (played in Timaru)
vs  16–5 (played in Dunedin)
vs Southland 6–17 (played in Invercargill)

Births

January–March
 1 January – Ruth Ross, historian
 4 January – Murray Gittos, fencer
 6 January – Winifred Lawrence, swimmer
 11 January – Betty Plant, netball player, coach and administrator
 14 January – Don Beard, cricketer
 24 January – 
 Len Jordan, rugby league player
 Gerard Wall, surgeon and politician
 26 January – Tapihana Paraire Paikea, politician
 29 January – Bob Yule, fighter pilot
 9 February – Fred Allen, rugby union player and coach
 17 February – Dorothea Anne Franchi, pianist, harpist, music educator and composer
 29 February – Mary Sullivan, netball player
 9 March – Diggeress Te Kanawa, tohunga raranga
 23 March – Peter Quilliam, jurist

April–June
 2 April – David Gay, soldier, cricketer and educator 
 4 April – Jim Kearney, rugby union player
 5 April – Pat Ralph, marine biology academic
 12 April – Shona Dunlop MacTavish, dancer, choreographer
 14 April – John Chewings, politician
 23 April – Colin Horsley, classical pianist and music teacher
 26 April – Joyce McDougall, psychoanalyst
 17 May – Frank Corner, diplomat
 18 May – Molly Macalister, sculptor
 19 May – Frank Tredrea, cyclist
 26 May
 Frank Bethwaite, pilot, boat designer
 Merimeri Penfold, Māori language academic
 4 June – Bev Malcolm, netball player
 8 June – Manahi Nitama Paewai, doctor, rugby union player, politician and community leader
 20 June – John O'Shea, filmmaker
 28 June – Kōhine Pōnika, composer of waiata Māori

July–September
 10 July – Warwick Snedden, cricketer
 11 July – Richard Dell, malacologist
 9 August – Albert Jones, amateur astronomer
 29 August
 Eric Batchelor, soldier
 Jack Laird, potter
 3 September – Peter de la Mare, physical organic chemist
 9 September – Joan Francis, cricketer
 10 September – Russell Pettigrew, businessman and philanthropist
 24 September – Alister Abernethy, trade unionist, politician and public servant
 30 September
 Margaret Alington, librarian and historian
 Trevor Horne, politician

October–December
 6 October – Hugh Sheridan, boxer
 7 October – James Brodie, geologist, oceanographer and amateur historian and philatelist
 8 October – Jean Wishart, magazine editor
 24 October – Ron Westerby, rugby league player
 28 October
 Peggy Dunstan, poet, writer
 Bob Stuart, rugby player and administrator
 1 November – Harry Dansey, journalist, cartoonist, broadcaster, politician and race relations conciliator
 9 November – John Macdonald, forensic psychiatrist
 16 November – Ronald Davison, jurist
 11 December – Gus Fisher, fashion industry leader and philanthropist
 15 December – Peg Batty, cricketer
 27 December – Warren Freer, politician
 28 December – Marty McDonnell, Australian rules footballer

Exact date unknown
 Entreaty, Thoroughbred racehorse

Deaths

January–March
 5 January – Walter Gudgeon, farmer, soldier, historian, land court judge, colonial administrator (born 1841)
 15 January – Richard Cockburn Maclaurin, mathematical physics academic (born 1870)
 24 January – William Plunket, 5th Baron Plunket, Governor of New Zealand (1904–1910) (born 1864)
 27 January – William Fitzgerald, teacher, educationalist (born 1838)
 29 January – Constance Frost, doctor, bacteriologist, pathologist (born 1863)
 3 March – George Vesey Stewart, politician (born 1832)

April–June
 10 April – Courtney Nedwill, doctor, public health officer (born 1837)
 21 April – Jesse Piper, politician (born 1836)
 26 April
 George Robertson, rugby union player (born 1859)
 George Hogben, educationalist, seismologist (born 1853)
 2 May – A. L. Beattie, locomotive designer/engineer (born 1852)
 6 May – James Black, cricketer (born 1873)
 13 May – Fred Hobbs, politician (born 1841)
 20 May – Henare Kaihau, politician
 20 June – John Grigg, astronomer (born 1838)

July–September
 23 July – Robin Dods, architect (born 1868)
 28 July – Edward Shillington, librarian (born 1835)
 17 August – Amey Daldy, women's suffrage campaigner (born 1829)
 23 August – David Cossgrove, teacher, soldier, scout leader (born 1852)
 25 August – Donald Reid, politician (born 1855)
 31 August – William MacDonald, politician (born 1862)
 26 September – Appo Hocton, servant, landlord, carter, farmer (born 1823)

October–December
 1 October – Henare Wepiha Te Wainohu, Māori leader, Anglican clergyman, army chaplain (born 1882)
 7 October – Chew Chong, merchant, fungus exporter, butter manufacturer (born 1844)
 10 October – Meri Te Tai Mangakāhia, women's suffrage campaigner (born 1868)
 14 October – Samuel Carnell, politician (born 1832)
 21 October – Mary Gibbs, community leader (born 1836)
 12 November – Thomas Porter, soldier, land purchase officer (born 1843)
 14 November – Edward Ker Mulgan, newspaper editor, teacher, school inspector (born 1858)
 17 November – Alexander Hogg, politician (born 1841)
 23 November – Cyril Mountfort, architect (born 1853)
 28 November – Peter Webb, rugby union player (born 1854)
 13 December – Joseph Tole, politician (born 1846)
 16 December – George Jones, politician (born 1844)
 27 December – Charles Button, politician, solicitor, judge (born 1838)

See also
History of New Zealand
List of years in New Zealand
Military history of New Zealand
Timeline of New Zealand history
Timeline of New Zealand's links with Antarctica
Timeline of the New Zealand environment

References

External links

 
Years of the 20th century in New Zealand